Bagotville may refer to:
 Bagotville, an alternate name for La Baie, Quebec
 CFB Bagotville, a Canadian Forces base
 Bagotville (tugboat) a 100-ton tugboat